Camptandra is a genus of plants in the ginger family. It contains 4 known species, all endemic to Malaysia.

 Camptandra gracillima (K.Schum.) Valeton - Sarawak
 Camptandra latifolia Ridl. - Peninsular Malaysia
 Camptandra ovata Ridl. - Peninsular Malaysia
 Camptandra parvula (King ex Baker) Ridl. - Peninsular Malaysia

References

Zingiberoideae
Zingiberaceae genera